The STOP is a type of remote controlled weapon station manufactured by Aselsan of Turkey. The system can be fitted with either a 25 mm  Oerlikon KBA or a M242 Bushmaster autocannon.

Overview
The weapon is mounted on a stabilized pedestal mounting which allows it to remain on target as the platform beneath it moves. The mounting does not penetrate the platform (except cables), making it relatively simple to fit the weapon to ships.

Electroptical suit of STOP is independent and separately stabilized. This enables surveillance and target tracking without aiming the gun to the target. Using its sight the STOP system can provide surveillance and target-tracking entirely without outside assistance, allowing it to function fully independently. It also can be integrated with combat management system of a ship. Its integrated training simulator provides crew training. There is also a manual operation mode as a back-up.

250 (2 x 125) rounds are carried on the mounting with duel feed system. The mount can traverse 360° when EO sights elevate between -30° to +80° and gun elevate between -15° to +55°. The system can be used during day and night under various weather.

Operators

Others
According to a report in 2019, Aselsan signed deals to export Aselsan STOP to five countries, but it did not disclose name of the clients.

References

Remote weapon stations
Aselsan products